Uncanny valley is a hypothesis that human replicas that appear almost, but not exactly, like real human beings elicit feelings of eeriness and revulsion among some observers.

Uncanny valley may also refer to:

Albums
 Uncanny Valley (Birds of Avalon album), 2009
 Uncanny Valley (Midnight Juggernauts album), 2013
 The Uncanny Valley, a 2016 album by Perturbator
 "Uncanny Valley" , a 2022 album by Coin

Television and film
 "The Uncanny Valley", the 12th episode of season 5, 2010, of Criminal Minds
 Uncanny Valley (film), a 2015 Argentine short film by Federico Heller

Books
 Uncanny Valley: Adventures in the Narrative, a 2011 collection of narrative nonfiction by Lawrence Weschler
 "Uncanny Valley", a 2017 science fiction short story by Greg Egan
 Uncanny Valley, a 2020 memoir by Anna Wiener

See also
 Uncanney Valley, a 2013 album by The Dismemberment Plan